Barbara Hicks (12 August 1924 – 6 September 2013) was an English film actress. She appeared in Terry Gilliam's 1985 cult film Brazil and Merchant Ivory Productions's 1992 Bafta award-winning Howards End.

Biography
Hicks was born in Wolverhampton, Staffordshire, and lived at Little Maplestead, Essex. She was educated at Adcote School, Shropshire.
After training at the Webber Douglas School of Dramatic Art, she made her first appearance on stage in 1948 at the Royal Court, Liverpool in Leo Marks’ Written for a Lady, which transferred to the Garrick Theatre, and became her West End debut.

She was married for 40 years to Lieutenant Colonel Peter Taylor (25 January 1913 – 26 March 2010). He was an outstanding front line commander who won two MCs in Italy in 1944.

Hicks appeared in Happy Birthday, Sir Larry, a National Theatre birthday tribute to Laurence Olivier, on 31 May 1987 in the presence of Olivier.

She was the mother of actor Giles Taylor.

Filmography

References

External links
 
 

1924 births
2013 deaths
English stage actresses
English film actresses
English television actresses
actors from Wolverhampton
20th-century British businesspeople